Francisco José Ruiz (born 7 June 1991) is a Spanish male volleyball player. He is part of the Spain men's national volleyball team. On club level he plays for Volley Marcianise.

References

External links
Profile at FIVB.org

1991 births
Living people
Spanish men's volleyball players
Sportspeople from Córdoba, Spain
Expatriate volleyball players in Italy
Expatriate volleyball players in Cyprus
Spanish expatriate sportspeople in Cyprus
Spanish expatriate sportspeople in Italy
Outside hitters